Baybridge is a small village in Hampshire, in England. It is situated to the east of Owslebury, south of Winchester.

References

External links

 

Villages in Hampshire